David Rautio (born July 29, 1985) is a Swedish professional ice hockey goaltender. He is currently playing for SCL Tigers in the National League (NL).

Playing career
Rautio played youth hockey and has played a large part of his professional career with his hometown club, Luleå HF, of the then Elitserien. He joined Linköping from Luleå, on a two-year contract on April 16, 2014.

Rautio played three seasons with Brynäs IF before leaving as a free agent following the 2018–19 season. On 23 April 2019, he returned for a third stint with original club, Luleå HF, signing a two-year contract. During the 2020–21 season, Rautio would transfer for a second stint with Linköping HC.

On 24 April 2022, Rautio extended his career in the SHL, by agreeing to a one-year contract with Timrå IK for the 2022–23 season. Assuming backup duties, Rautio made just 5 appearances with Timrå IK before opting to leave and sign for the remainder of the season with Swiss NL club, SCL Tigers, on 9 February 2023.

References

External links

1985 births
Living people
Almtuna IS players
Brynäs IF players
IK Oskarshamn players
Lillehammer IK players
Linköping HC players
Luleå HF players
SCL Tigers players
Swedish expatriate ice hockey players in Norway
Swedish ice hockey goaltenders
People from Luleå
Sportspeople from Norrbotten County
Timrå IK players